The 2018 Challenger Banque Nationale de Drummondville was a professional tennis tournament played on indoor hard courts. It was the 12th edition of the tournament and part of the 2018 ATP Challenger Tour, offering a total of $75,000 in prize money. It took place in Drummondville, Canada between March 13 and March 18, 2018.

Singles main-draw entrants

Seeds

1 Rankings are as of March 5, 2018

Other entrants
The following players received wildcards into the singles main draw:
 Pavel Krainik
 Jack Mingjie Lin
 Samuel Monette
 Benjamin Sigouin

The following players entered the singles main draw with a protected ranking:
 Frank Dancevic
 Michał Przysiężny

The following players received entry as alternates:
 Joris De Loore
 Alejandro González
 Nicolaas Scholtz

The following players received entry from the qualifying draw:
 Antoine Escoffier
 Alejandro Gómez
 Ruan Roelofse
 Aleksandar Vukic

The following players received entry as lucky losers:
 JC Aragone
 Jared Hiltzik

Champions

Singles

 Denis Kudla def.  Benjamin Bonzi, 6–0, 7–5

Doubles

 Joris De Loore /  Frederik Nielsen def.  Luis David Martínez /  Filip Peliwo, 6–4, 6–3

External links
Official website

Challenger Banque Nationale de Drummondville
Challenger de Drummondville
Challenger Banque Nationale de Drummondville